William  Ewart Walton (7 July 1871–1929) was an English footballer who played in the Football League for Blackburn Rovers.

References

1871 births
1929 deaths
People from Ribchester
English footballers
Association football defenders
English Football League players
Clitheroe F.C. players
Blackburn Rovers F.C. players